Canel's is a Mexican confectionery company founded in 1925 in San Luis Potosí, Mexico. The company's main product line is chewing gum, but it also manufactures soft and hard candies, gummies, cremes, fresh breath products, fruit chews, milk caramel chews, toffees, lollipops, jelly beans, and more.

The company sponsors a professional cycling team called Canel's–Specialized and is also a regional sponsor for Renault Sport Formula One Team. It also sponsors Liga MX side Atlético San Luis.

References

External links 
 Canel's website

Confectionery companies
Food and drink companies established in 1925
Mexican brands
Food and drink companies of Mexico
Mexican companies established in 1925